Sir Duncan Ross McLarty,  (17 March 1891 – 22 December 1962) was an Australian politician and the 17th Premier of Western Australia.

Early life
McLarty was born in Pinjarra, Western Australia, the youngest of seven children of Edward McLarty, a farmer and grazier and member of the Western Australian Legislative Council, and his wife Mary Jane, née Campbell. He attended Pinjarra State School and the Perth Boys' High School.

On 12 January 1916 he enlisted in the Australian Imperial Force at the Blackboy Hill depot. On 27 March he was promoted to corporal and assigned to the 44th Battalion, arriving in England on 21 July. The 44th Battalion departed England for the Western Front on 25 November 1916. McLarty was promoted to sergeant on 29 March 1917. In June 1918, McLarty was awarded the Military Medal for "bravery in the field" on 25 January 1918 at Passchendaele.

McLarty was commissioned on 1 May 1918 as a second lieutenant and was promoted to lieutenant on 1 August. This was the rank he held until being discharged. On 28 August 1918, during the Second Battle of the Somme, McLarty was wounded in the left hand. While convalescing in London he had a chance meeting with his brother Douglas who was serving with the 16th Battalion.

After the war, McLarty returned to farming at Pinjarra and married Violet Olive Margaret Herron on 25 October 1922. He served as a justice of the peace from 1925 and belonged to the Returned Sailors', Soldiers' and Airmen's Imperial League of Australia.

Parliamentary career
He campaigned in the 1930 state election as a Nationalist candidate with the slogan 'A practical farmer for a farming electorate', winning the lower house seat of Murray-Wellington. At the 1933 election, the Nationalists were defeated by the Labor Party under Philip Collier, beginning a 14-year period in opposition for the conservative parties. On 14 December 1946, McLarty succeeded the retired Robert Ross McDonald as leader of the newly formed Liberal Party, which had amalgamated with the Nationalists.

Premiership
The 1947 election saw the Liberal-Country coalition unexpectedly defeat the Labor government of premier Frank Wise who had held the position for only two years. For the first time since 1933, the Liberal (formerly Nationalist) group in Parliament was larger than the Country Party's and, under the negotiated coalition agreement, McLarty became premier and the Country Party's Arthur Watts became his deputy.

Together with the premiership, he held the Treasury, Housing, Forests and North-West portfolios. His administration coincided with rapid post-war expansion of the Western Australian economy and, in 1950, conducted negotiations with BP to develop the Kwinana Oil Refinery whose surrounding area subsequently developed into the state's main industrial district. His government accepted federal funding to establish the State Housing Commission. His premiership was, however, marred by discord between the two coalition parties. He was knighted in January 1953 and lost office at the election next month, continuing as opposition leader for another four years until March 1957.

Throughout his parliamentary career, McLarty travelled home to Pinjarra for most weekends. He was chairman of the Murray District Hospital Board and held a number of pastoral investments, including a controlling interest in Liveringa station, near Derby. He resigned from parliament because of poor health in May 1962 and died in December. McLarty was accorded a state funeral and is buried in the Pinjarra cemetery.

See also
 McLarty–Watts Ministry

References

Further reading
 McLarty, D. R. (1951) The Development of Western Australia London: Commonwealth Parliamentary Association, United Kingdom Branch "An address given in the rooms of The Commonwealth Parliamentary Association (United Kingdom Branch), Westminster Hall, on 20 March 1951, with the Rt. Hon Lord Llewellin, C.B.E., M.C. in the chair" -Inside cover.
 West, K. Power in the Liberal Party (Melb, 1965)
 The West Australian, 13 Feb 1957, 19 May 1962, 24 December 1962
 McLarty, M. Sir Duncan Ross McLarty, KBE, MM (State Library of Western Australia)
 McLarty family papers, 1887–1969 (State Library of Western Australia)
 Sir Ross McLarty, political ephemera (PR3597/1-10, State Library of Western Australia)
 Jamieson, R. interviews with R. Doig (transcript, 1984–86, State Library of Western Australia).
 Layman, Lenore McLarty, Sir Duncan Ross (1891–1962) Australian Dictionary of Biography – online edition published by Australian National University

External links
 Duncan Ross McLarty (Liberal) 1 April 1947 to 23 February 1953 Constitutional Centre of Western Australia

|-

|-

1891 births
1962 deaths
Australian Army officers
Australian military personnel of World War I
Volunteer Defence Corps officers
Australian Knights Commander of the Order of the British Empire
Australian politicians awarded knighthoods
Australian recipients of the Military Medal
Leaders of the Opposition in Western Australia
Liberal Party of Australia members of the Parliament of Western Australia
Members of the Western Australian Legislative Assembly
People from Pinjarra, Western Australia
Premiers of Western Australia
Treasurers of Western Australia
20th-century Australian politicians
Australian monarchists